The following is a list of television stations that are either affiliated or owned-and-operated by ABS-CBN.

It ceased its operations on August 28, 2020 after almost 32 years following the denial of its legislative franchise on July 10.

Free-to-air television stations

ABS-CBN

Analog

VHF

UHF 

 Since July 2018, local programs are delivered from Manila via Channel 2; not becoming a relay station of TV-10 Iloilo.
 Ran from July 2018 as a North Luzon sub-opt, with separate breakfast shows and local advertising; downgraded to a Baguio semi-satellite station from November 3, 2018
Since July 2018, but continues local advertising and short local bulletin opt-outs on weekdays until May 2019; became a Baguio semi-satellite station from May 20, 2019.
On January 5, 2022, the channel's frequency is assigned to Advanced Media Broadcasting System

Former Analog 
 Fully shut off its analog signal and migrated to digital.

Digital terrestrial

S+A 

 * Co-located with VHF TV stations; ** Owned by ABS-CBN; *** With pending application with the NTC; **** Owned by AMCARA.

Former Analog 
 Fully shut off its analog signal and migrated to digital.

Pay Television Channels 
ABS-CBN News Channel
Cinema One*
TeleRadyo
Jeepney TV*
Knowledge Channel
Cine Mo!
Metro Channel*
Myx*
O Shopping
Kapamilya Channel
(* operated by Creative Programs)

Direct-to-home/Satellite broadcast networks 
 S+A International
 ANC International
 Cinema One International
 Lifestyle Network International
 Myx TV (North America)
 The Filipino Channel

Radio stations

AM radio network (Radyo Patrol)

FM radio network (MOR Philippines)

 Relay from MOR 103.1 For Life! Baguio.

See also 
 ABS-CBN

References 

ABS-CBN Corporation
Radio stations in the Philippines by owner
Assets owned by ABS-CBN Corporation
Mass media companies of the Philippines
Philippine television-related lists